Cheshmeh Khuni (also Romanized as Cheshmeh Khūnī) is a village in Hana Rural District, in the Central District of Semirom County, Isfahan Province, Iran. At the 2006 census, its population was 166, in 40 families.

References 

Populated places in Semirom County